Simon Mirren is a British television writer and producer. He is a nephew of the actress Helen Mirren.

Career
Simon Mirren began his career writing for British series like medical drama Casualty, spy thriller Spooks and Waking the Dead. He then moved on to writing and producing for American series Without a Trace and Third Watch. He then became a producer and writer for the procedural Criminal Minds.

Mirren co-wrote and produced the television series Versailles, dramatising the life of Louis XIV of France. The first season of Versailles received mixed to positive reviews from critics. On 17 April 2018, Variety reported that the third season of Versailles would be its last.

References

External links
 

Living people
British television producers
British soap opera writers
British television writers
English television writers
English screenwriters
English male screenwriters
English soap opera writers
British male television writers
Year of birth missing (living people)